Roderick Alonso Miller Molina (born 3 April 1992) is a Panamanian professional footballer who played as a center-back for Iraqi Premier League club Al-Minaa and the Panama national team.

Club career
In 2014, Miller had a spell in Mexican football with Mérida.

On 21 January 2019, FC Okzhetpes announced the signing of Miller on a one-year contract. Miller left Okzhetpes by mutual consent on 25 July 2019.

In September 2021, Miller made a surprise move to Iraq for Al-Quwa Al-Jawiya.

International career
Miller was part of the Panama U-20 squad  that played at the 2011 FIFA U-20 World Cup in Colombia.

He made his senior debut for Panama in an October 2011 FIFA World Cup qualification match against Dominica and has, as of 10 June 2015, earned a total of 10 caps, scoring no goals including a 2012 unofficial match against Guyana. He represented his country at the 2013 CONCACAF Gold Cup.

References

External links
 
 

1992 births
Living people
Association football fullbacks
Panamanian footballers
Sportspeople from Panama City
Panama international footballers
2013 CONCACAF Gold Cup players
Copa América Centenario players
2017 Copa Centroamericana players
2017 CONCACAF Gold Cup players
San Francisco F.C. players
C.F. Mérida footballers
Atlético Nacional footballers
C.D. Feirense players
FC Okzhetpes players
Al-Mina'a SC players
Liga Panameña de Fútbol players
Ascenso MX players
Categoría Primera A players
Kazakhstan Premier League players
Panamanian expatriate footballers
Panamanian expatriate sportspeople in Colombia
Panamanian expatriate sportspeople in Mexico
Panamanian expatriate sportspeople in Portugal
Panamanian expatriate sportspeople in Iraq
Expatriate footballers in Mexico
Expatriate footballers in Colombia
Expatriate footballers in Portugal
Expatriate footballers in Iraq
2021 CONCACAF Gold Cup players